Luka Lapenda (born 1 January 1988) is a Swiss football forward who played for Grasshopper Club Zürich in the Swiss Super League. In September 2010 he joined FC Croatia of the Swiss 3. Liga (sixth tier).

References

1988 births
Living people
Swiss men's footballers
Grasshopper Club Zürich players
FC Basel players
Swiss Super League players
Association football forwards